The Socialist Party of Vietnam was a political party in Vietnam which existed from 1946 to 1988. It was founded with the official aim of uniting "patriotic intelligentsia". Along with the Democratic Party of Vietnam, the Socialist Party joined the government of North Vietnam. Key leaders of the party included Nguyễn Xiển, who served as its deputy secretary from 1946 to 1956 and as its secretary from 1956 until the party's dissolution in 1988; and Hoàng Minh Giám, who served as the party's deputy secretary from 1956 to 1988 and as North Vietnam's foreign minister.

References

1940s in French Indochina
1946 establishments in Vietnam
1950s in French Indochina
1988 disestablishments in Vietnam
Defunct political parties in Vietnam
Democratic socialist parties in Asia
Nationalist parties in Vietnam
Political parties disestablished in 1988
Political parties established in 1946
Socialist parties in Vietnam